Octaethylene glycol monododecyl ether (C12E8) is a nonionic surfactant formed by the ethoxylation of dodecanol (lauryl alcohol) to give a material with 8 repeat units of ethylene glycol.

See also
 Pentaethylene glycol monododecyl ether, C12E5

References

Non-ionic surfactants
Glycol ethers